Danielle Joy McKinney is a contemporary visual artist who is stationed in New Jersey. Her paintings have been included in exhibitions in America.

Early life 

Danielle McKinney was born in Montgomery, Alabama in 1981, where she was raised in Southern Baptist. McKinney was always connected to art. Her grandmother introduced her to painting and signed her up for lessons, and her mother gifted her an old Nikon film camera when Mckinney was 15. Though further into her academic career Mckinney got her start in photography, earning a BFA from the Atlanta College of Art and later an MFA in the medium from Parsons School of Design. Though she painted on the side, it was only when Mckinney spent two years in Pont-Aven, France, before graduate school that she formally took up painting classes for the first time. Even though she had a passion for both photography during the Covid 19 lockdown she pursued her career of painting full-time.

Career 

McKinney is based in New Jersey. She produces story paintings that highlight the strong, independent female lead. Mckinney catches the figure engaged in leisurely activities and intense reflections. Her paintings reveal hidden storylines and evoke surreal settings, frequently in the context of the internal home world, as she engages with topics of spirituality and self. With a background in photography paints with a keen awareness of the female gaze, using very vivid colors and subtle details to theatrical effect.

Mckinney views her work as a place of reconciliation between her Black female identity and the possibilities of rest and liberation that dominant visual culture has failed to depict, even though her paintings are not self-portraits. She paints with the intention of evoking this sensation of identification between the viewer and the subject, giving them both the opportunity to enter their most liberated selves.

Exhibitions 

● 2021 SAW MY SHADOW, Fortnight Institute | New York

● 2022 Golden Hour, Marianne Boesky Gallery | New York

● 2022 Smoke and Mirrors, Night Gallery | Los Angeles

● 2022 IN A DREAM YOU SAW A WAY TO SURVIVE AND YOU WERE FULL OF JOY, The Contemporary Austin | TX

● 2022 Black Melancholia, Hessel Museum of Art | NY

References

Further reading 
Taming the Bird: Danielle McKinney Danielle McKinney in conversation with Alison Gingeras, Mousse Magazine

1981 births
Living people
21st-century American painters
People from Montgomery County, Alabama
Parsons School of Design alumni
Atlanta College of Art alumni